Rząb or Rzab is a surname of Polish-language origin. It may refer to:

Władysław Rząb (1910-1992), Polish painter
Greg Rzab (born 1959), American musician

Polish-language surnames